The 5th Artistic Gymnastics World Championships were held in Turin, Italy, in conjunction with the 8th Italian Federal Festival of Gymnastics, on May 13, 1911.

Medal table

Notes
1 Official documents from the International Gymnastics Federation credit medals earned by athletes from Bohemia (BOH) as medals for Czechoslovakia (TCH).
2 Some sources erroneously claim that Jules Labéeu represented Belgium, while, in fact, he represented France.
3  The bronze medal earned by Stane Vidmar, originally from Austria-Hungary, is officially credited by the International Gymnastics Federation as a medal for Yugoslavia (YUG), even though the nation did not exist at the time.

Medal summary

References

World Artistic Gymnastics Championships
International gymnastics competitions hosted by Italy
World Artistic Gymnastics Championships, 1911
1911 in gymnastics